The third season of Srugim, is an Israeli television drama which originally aired on Yes TV between 23 October 2011 and 29 January 2012. It was directed by Laizy Shapiro, who co-created it with Hava Divon.

In 2012 it was announced that season 3 is the final season.

Cast

Main
Ohad Knoller as Dr. Nethaniel "Nati" Brenner
Amos Tamam as Amir Yechezkel
Ya'el Sharoni as Yifat
Tali Sharon as Hodaya Baruchin
Sharon Fauster as Reut Rosen

Recurring
Ariel, Amir's study partner

Plot
Yifat finally becomes pregnant. Roi has turned ultra-orthodox and has an arranged marriage. Amir quits his job as a teacher, finds a new one as Reut's secretary and finally receives a lifelong tuition to study in a seminary. Nati has a new roommate, a poet named Azaria, who was abandoned by his fiancée, Tehila. Nati falls in love with Tehila but cannot convince her to see him for she vowed to remain single until Azaria finds a new partner. Nati encourages Reut to date Azaria, who begins to exploit her for her money. After becoming drunk, he confesses that he does not love her and she abandons him. Tehila starts seeing Nati; he is finally ready to commit and proposes to her, and she seems to accept. Hodaya encounters Avri again. He cancels his own planned wedding and asks her to marry him instead. Hodaya backs off once more, just a few days before the ceremony, leaving him heartbroken. Amir becomes friends with a boy at his yeshiva and goes to work in a ranch in the Negev with him for a few weeks. Hodaya receives a radio show of her own, becomes stressed and quits. Yifat admonishes her for her constant wavering. Tehila speaks with Azaria, and informs Nati they decided to resume their relationship. Nati sinks into depression. Yifat delivers her baby prematurely; Reut and Hodaya stay with her while Nati drives off to fetch Amir. He must stay in the empty ranch while Amir drives back to Jerusalem. Reut comes to bring him back, and they both reconcile while staying in the desert. Hodaya, who heeded Yifat's words, gets her job back and reunites with Avri. Amir and Yifat prepare to take their newborn son home.

Episodes

Production
Principal photography for the third season began on 21 February 2010. In early May 2012, though the last season was considered the most successful so far, Shapiro and Divon announced they would not produce a fourth one, and the show was terminated.

Ratings
The third season aired on Yes between 23 October 2011 and 29 January 2012. The TIM-TNS survey concluded that 11% of all internet users in Israel watched the show via Yes' website in November 2011, and 15% in January 2012, making it the third most popular on the net. The last season was considered both the most commercially and critically successful in the show's history.

Awards
In the 2012 Israeli Academy of Film and Television Awards, Srugim was nominated in only one category, for Best Drama, and lost.

Source:

References

2011 Israeli television seasons
2012 Israeli television seasons